Arsterturm was a Hansa A Type cargo ship which was built in 1944 Deutsche Dampfschiffahrts-Gesellschaft Hansa, Bremen. She was bombed and sunk on 26 February 1945.

Description

The ship was propelled by a compound steam engine. The ship had a crew of 25, plus 8 to 10 flak soldiers. It was equipped with 1×30-tonne crane, 1×10-tonne crane and 10×5 tonne cranes.

History
Arsterturm was a Hansa A Type cargo ship built in 1944 as yard number 447 by Deutsche Werft, Finkenwerder, Germany for Deutsche Dampfschiffahrts-Gesellschaft Hansa, Bremen. She was launched on 13 September 1944 and completed on 31 October. Her port of registry was Bremen and the Code Letters DOYO were allocated. She participated in the evacuation of the Ostgebiete in December 1944.

On 26 February 1945, Arsterturm was bombed, torpedoed and sunk by Allied aircraft south of Kristiansund, Norway with the loss of 31 of her crew. She was on a voyage from Swinemünde to Tromsø, Norway with a cargo of ammunition.

References

1944 ships
Ships built in Germany
World War II merchant ships of Germany
Steamships of Germany
Maritime incidents in February 1945
Merchant ships sunk by aircraft
World War II shipwrecks in the Norwegian Sea